is the first game in the PS2 trilogy of Space Battleship Yamato games.

References

External links
 Bandai's site for its series of Space Battleship Yamato games for the Playstation 2 

2004 video games
Japan-exclusive video games
PlayStation 2 games
PlayStation 2-only games
Bandai games
Space Battleship Yamato video games
Video games developed in Japan